Little Rome may refer to:

 Asmara, Eritrea
 Canosa di Puglia, Italy
 Lipa, Batangas, Philippones
 Blaj, Romania
 Trnava, Slovakia
 Negombo, Sri Lanka
 Birmingham Oratory, in Birmingham, England
 Brookland (Washington, D.C.), a neighborhood of Washington, D.C., United States
 Little Rome (Lake City, Colorado), a 19th-century mining camp on the National Register of Historic Places listings in Hinsdale County, Colorado

See also
 Rome